Ghost Story was an American television horror anthology series that aired for one season on NBC from 1972 to 1973. Executive-produced by William Castle, Ghost Story featured supernatural entities such as ghosts, vampires, and witches. The show's format and tone drew comparisons to NBC's Night Gallery and ABC's The Sixth Sense. 
 By mid-season, low ratings led to a title change to Circle Of Fear and a change to the format.

Premise
The series was hosted by Sebastian Cabot as Winston Essex, the owner of a mysterious hotel called Mansfield House. 
Cabot's introductions were filmed in the Hotel del Coronado near San Diego, California. Ghost Story dealt exclusively with ghosts, vampires, witches, and other supernatural elements. Starting with the 14th episode when the show was retitled Circle of Fear, Cabot's introduction and ending monologues are no longer featured.

Cast

Main
 Sebastian Cabot as Winston Essex (episodes 1-13)

Production

Casting
Guest stars included Helen Hayes, Jason Robards, Patricia Neal, William Windom, Gena Rowlands, Carolyn Jones, Melvyn Douglas, Tyne Daly, David Soul, Karen Black and Jodie Foster.

Writing
Several episodes were also written by Jimmy Sangster, a British screenwriter, producer and director of Hammer Films.

The episode "House of Evil"  (working title "The Doll's House"), was an original teleplay by Robert Bloch (written as "The Doll's House").

D.C. Fontana scripted the episode "Earth, Air, Fire and Water", based on a story by herself and Harlan Ellison. Both writers had worked on Star Trek, the former extensively.

Renaming
Beginning with "Time of Terror", the series' thirteenth episode, which aired on January 5, 1973, the series was renamed Circle of Fear. 
The change was necessary, according to executive producer  William Castle, because of low ratings. He attributed the title change to the head of the production company, Screen Gems. Additionally, Cabot was dropped as the presenter. 
The opening title graphics and theme music were also changed. This reworked version lasted nine further episodes.

Episodes

Pilot (1972)

Season 1 (1972–73)

Home media
Two episodes of the series were included as bonuses in the 2009 DVD box set The William Castle Film Collection. On May 1, 2012, Sony released Ghost Story (a.k.a. Circle of Fear) - The Complete Series on DVD through its manufacture on demand (MOD) program.

On July 22, 2020 The complete series was released by Via Vision Entertainment on DVD and Blu-ray in Australia. As a bonus, it included audio tracks from the original 1972 story LP William Castle's Ghost Story — Thrilling, Chilling Sounds of Fright and the Supernatural, originally released by Peter Pan Records.

References

External links
Ghost Story at CVTA with episode list

A review of and more information on the Ghost Story Blu-ray release

1970s American anthology television series
1972 American television series debuts
1973 American television series endings
English-language television shows
1970s American horror television series
NBC original programming
Television series by Sony Pictures Television
Television series by Screen Gems